Love Me or Make Love to Me is a 1942 German musical comedy film directed by Harald Braun and starring Marika Rökk, Viktor Staal and Hans Brausewetter. The film is a backstage musical about a showgirl aspiring to greater things while sorting out her financial and romantic problems, it was a major commercial success on its release.

It was shot at the Tempelhof Studios in Berlin. The films sets were designed by the art director Ernst H. Albrecht.

Cast

References

External links

1942 musical comedy films
German musical comedy films
Films of Nazi Germany
Films directed by Harald Braun
German black-and-white films
Films shot at Tempelhof Studios
UFA GmbH films
1940s German films